A constitutional referendum was held in Chad and Ubangi-Shari on 21 October 1945 as part of the wider French constitutional referendum. Both questions were approved by large margins. Voter turnout was 83.5%.

Results

Question I

Question II

References

1945 referendums
1945
1945
1945 in Ubangi-Shari
1945 in Chad
1945
Constitutional referendums in France
Referendums in Ubangi-Shari
October 1945 events in Africa